The GenBank sequence database is an open access, annotated collection of all publicly available nucleotide sequences and their protein translations. It is produced and maintained by the National Center for Biotechnology Information (NCBI; a part of the National Institutes of Health in the United States) as part of the International Nucleotide Sequence Database Collaboration (INSDC).

GenBank and its collaborators receive sequences produced in laboratories throughout the world from more than 500,000 formally described species. The database started in 1982 by Walter Goad and Los Alamos National Laboratory. GenBank has become an important database for research in biological fields and has grown in recent years at an exponential rate by doubling roughly every 18 months.

Release 250.0, published in June 2022, contained over 17 trillion nucleotide bases in more than 2,45 billion sequences. GenBank is built by direct submissions from individual laboratories, as well as from bulk submissions from large-scale sequencing centers.

Submissions
Only original sequences can be submitted to GenBank. Direct submissions are made to GenBank using BankIt, which is a Web-based form, or the stand-alone submission program, Sequin. Upon receipt of a sequence submission, the GenBank staff examines the originality of the data and assigns an accession number to the sequence and performs quality assurance checks. The submissions are then released to the public database, where the entries are retrievable by Entrez or downloadable by FTP. Bulk submissions of Expressed Sequence Tag (EST), Sequence-tagged site (STS), Genome Survey Sequence (GSS), and High-Throughput Genome Sequence (HTGS) data are most often submitted by large-scale sequencing centers. The GenBank direct submissions group also processes complete microbial genome sequences.

History 
Walter Goad of the Theoretical Biology and Biophysics Group at Los Alamos National Laboratory (LANL) and others established the Los Alamos Sequence Database in 1979, which culminated in 1982 with the creation of the public GenBank. Funding was provided by the National Institutes of Health, the National Science Foundation, the Department of Energy, and the Department of Defense. LANL collaborated on GenBank with the firm Bolt, Beranek, and Newman, and by the end of 1983 more than 2,000 sequences were stored in it.

In the mid 1980s, the Intelligenetics bioinformatics company at Stanford University managed the GenBank project in collaboration with LANL. As one of the earliest bioinformatics community projects on the Internet, the GenBank project started BIOSCI/Bionet news groups for promoting open access communications among bioscientists. During 1989 to 1992, the GenBank project transitioned to the newly created National Center for Biotechnology Information (NCBI).

Growth

The GenBank release notes for release 250.0 (June 2022) state that "from 1982 to the present, the number of bases in GenBank has doubled approximately every 18 months". As of 15 June 2022, GenBank release 250.0 has over 239 million loci, 1,39 trillion nucleotide bases, from 239 million reported sequences.

The GenBank database includes additional data sets that are constructed mechanically from the main sequence data collection, and therefore are excluded from this count.

Incomplete identifications
Public databases which may be searched using the National Center for Biotechnology Information Basic Local Alignment Search Tool (NCBI BLAST), lack peer-reviewed sequences of type strains and sequences of non-type strains. On the other hand, while commercial databases potentially contain high-quality filtered sequence data, there are a limited number of reference sequences.

A paper released in the Journal of Clinical Microbiology evaluated the 16S rRNA gene sequencing results analyzed with GenBank in conjunction with other freely available, quality-controlled, web-based public databases, such as the EzTaxon-e and the BIBI databases. The results showed that analyses performed using GenBank combined with EzTaxon-e (kappa = 0.79) were more discriminative than using GenBank (kappa = 0.66) or other databases alone.

GenBank, being a public database, may contain sequences wrongly assigned to a particular species, because the initial identification of the organism was wrong. A recent article published in Genome showed that 75% of mitochondrial Cytochrome c oxidase subunit I sequences were wrongly assigned to the fish Nemipterus mesoprion resulting from continued usage of sequences of initially misidentified individuals. The authors provide recommendations how to avoid further distribution of publicly available sequences with incorrect scientific names.

Numerous published manuscripts have identified erroneous sequences on GenBank.
These are not only incorrect species assignments (which can have different causes) but also include chimeras and accession records with sequencing errors. A recent manuscript on the quality of all Cytochrome b records of birds further showed that 45% of the identified erroneous records lack a voucher specimen that prevents a reassessment of the species identification.

See also

 Ensembl
 Human Protein Reference Database (HPRD)
 Sequence analysis
 UniProt
 List of sequenced eukaryotic genomes
 List of sequenced archaeal genomes
 RefSeq — the Reference Sequence Database
 Geneious — includes a GenBank Submission Tool
 Open science data

References

External links
GenBank
Example sequence record, for hemoglobin beta
BankIt
Sequin — a stand-alone software tool developed by the NCBI for submitting and updating entries to the GenBank sequence database.
EMBOSS — free, open source software for molecular biology
GenBank, RefSeq, TPA and UniProt: What's in a Name?

National Institutes of Health
Genetics databases
Genome databases
Bioinformatics
Biological databases